Jorge Martín Arteaga (born 26 November 1998) is a Peruvian footballer who plays as a goalkeeper for Deportivo Coopsol.

Career

Club career
Arteaga joined Deportivo Municipal from Esther Grande in mid-2016. On 28 May 2017, 18-year Arteaga got his official Peruvian Primera División debut for Deportivo Municipal against Sport Rosario. Starting goalkeeper, Erick Delgado, received a red card after 65 minutes, why Arteaga was subbed in to his first professional game. Arteaga was the fourth choice in that season.

In the 2018 season, he was only on the bench for one game, while he in the 2019 season wasn't on the bench for a single game. At the end of November 2021 Deportivo Municipal confirmed, that Arteaga would leave the club at the end of the year.

Ahead of the 2022 season, Arteaga joined Deportivo Coopsol.

References

External links
 

Living people
1998 births
Association football goalkeepers
Peruvian footballers
Peruvian Primera División players
Esther Grande footballers
Deportivo Municipal footballers
Deportivo Coopsol players
Footballers from Lima